Leurda ("ramsons") may refer to several villages in Romania:

 Leurda, a village in Cășeiu Commune, Cluj County
 Leurda, a village in the town of Motru, Gorj County
 Valea Leurdei, a tributary of the Crișul Pietros in Bihor County